The LG-GD910 is a 3G watch phone that has a touchscreen and video calling capabilities; manufacturer LG Electronics claims it is the first market-ready example of such a device.

Features
The LG-GD910 is constructed using a waterproof, metal casing and has a curved, tempered glass face. It is 13.9 mm thick. The touchscreen is 1.43-inches (3.63 cm) across, 352 x 288 pixels, and uses LG’s Flash interface.  

The LG-GD910 is compatible with 7.2 Mbit/s 3G HSDPA, which enables the high speed data transmission required to make video calls using the in-built camera. It also supports Bluetooth headsets, including stereo audio, and has a built-in speaker. There is a Text to Speech option for handling text messages and other information, and voice recognition features can be used to look up contact details and make calls.  The device is preloaded with over 15 languages, not including English.

Availability
The LG-GD910 was developed from a prototype that the company first demonstrated in 2008. The LG-GD910 was first publicly shown at CES 2009.
As it was a limited edition product, only a limited number were released in Europe and a few other countries. Despite its HSDPA capabilities, it lacks a built-in web browser. It also includes Multimedia Messaging Service (MMS) capabilities, but this did not work in Korea. Orange confirmed that only SMS is fully working with stock firmware.

The LG-GD910 was launched in Europe during 2009 via the Orange network. It was launched in India in April 2010.

References

External links
LG’s official UK webpage for the GD910
Engadget: LG's GD910 wrist phone in action
PocketPicks: Photo gallery from Mobile World Congress 2009

LG Electronics mobile phones
Watch phones